Powhatan County is a county located in the Commonwealth of Virginia. As of the 2020 census, the population was 30,033. Its county seat is Powhatan.

Powhatan County is included in the Greater Richmond Region.

The James River forms the county's northern border, and the Appomattox River is on the south side.  The county is named for the paramount chief of the powerful confederacy of tribes of Algonquian-speaking Native Americans in the Tidewater in 1607, when the British settled at Jamestown. Historically this Piedmont area had been occupied by the Siouan-speaking Monacan. They moved further west, abandoning villages in this area, under pressure from colonists.

In 1700 French Huguenot refugees settled at a Monacan abandoned village, which they renamed as Manakin Town. It was located about 20 miles above the falls on the James River. French refugees also settled on the other side of the river in two villages now known collectively as Manakin-Sabot in nearby Goochland County to the north.

History

Mowhemencho Indian village

See Native American tribes in Virginia

Long before the arrival of Europeans in the 17th century, all of the territory of Virginia, including the Piedmont area, was populated by various tribes of Native Americans. They were the historic tribes descended from thousands of years of succeeding and varied indigenous cultures. Among the historic tribes in the Piedmont were the Monacan, who were Siouan-speaking and were recorded as having several villages west of what the colonists later called Manakin Town on the James River.

They and other Siouan tribes traditionally competed with and were in conflict with the members of the Powhatan Confederacy, Algonquian-speaking tribes who generally inhabited the coastal Tidewater area along the Atlantic and rivers feeding it. They also were subject to raids by Iroquois from the north, who were based south of the Great Lakes in present-day New York and Pennsylvania. By the end of the 17th century, the Monacan had been decimated by warfare and infectious diseases carried by the mostly English colonists and traders; their survivors were absorbed into other Siouan tribes.

Manakin Town 
In 1700 and 1701, about 700-800 French Huguenot religious refugees on five ships arrived at Jamestown from London, having been promised land grants and settlement in Lower Norfolk County by the Crown. Many of them had been merchants and artisans in London, which was overflowing with refugees from French Catholic persecution after the Revocation of the Edict of Nantes in 1685. Others had found temporary refuge in Holland, Switzerland, Germany, and Ireland. As the tobacco plantations along the James River were dependent upon shipping and water transport, the area in the Piedmont above the head of navigation at the fall line had not yet been settled.

They also offered land on the north side of the James River, in what became Goochland County. They wanted the French there as a buffer from Virginia Indians for the English settlements. Byrd also hoped to develop land that he held in that area. The falls area was later developed as the settlement of Richmond, which became capital of the state.

The first years on the frontier were harsh for the urban French; of the 390 French who settled at Manakin Town, only 150 lived there by 1705. The falls on the river prevented them from traveling downriver and the lack of roads mean that they were very isolated, and essentially cut off from the Jamestown settlement.  They ran short of supplies, and initially were ill-suited to carve an agricultural settlement from the frontier. They did use some land that had been cleared by the Monacan. Although they had planned to build a town based on the French village model, it proved impractical, as the most fertile land lay along the James River.

So they placed their church and glebe lands in the center of the granted acreage and that became the center for their farms. The grant was divided more or less equally, with each grantee in 1710 receiving about 133 acres, stretching in narrow lots from the river, so that each household would have access to the water. By then, many French families had already migrated to other parts of Virginia and North Carolina. The grants would prove too limited for growing families.

The French became established and assimilated in colonial Virginia; services at the Manakin Episcopal Church (King William Parish) were gradually held more in English than French.  The French ultimately adopted the English language and elements of culture, intermarried with many planter families of English descent in the area and to the west, and purchased African slaves as laborers when they could afford them. Many of the Huguenot descendants migrated west into the Piedmont and across the Appalachian Mountains into Kentucky and Tennessee, as did neighboring English colonists, as well as south along the coast, with some ultimately settling in Texas. Today that state has the largest number of members in the Huguenot Society, a lineage association.

Present-day State Route 288 and State Route 711 run about a mile east of the former town. The 1895 Huguenot Memorial Chapel and Monument, the fourth church building constructed there, is maintained by the Huguenot Society. It is listed on the National Register of Historic Places. In addition, the nearby Manakin Episcopal Church, built in 1954, continues full services for a regional congregation.

Powhatan County

In May 1777, the Virginia General Assembly created Powhatan County out of land from the eastern portion of Cumberland County between the Appomattox and James rivers. Residents named the county in honor of Chief Powhatan, paramount chief of the Powhatan Confederacy. He had allied with Algonquian-speaking tribes in the Tidewater, numbering about 30,000 in population at the time of the Jamestown settlement. He was also the father of Pocahontas, whom colonists perceived as friendly. While in captivity, she accepted Christianity and married English settler John Rolfe. Many of their descendants were counted among the First Families of Virginia.

For the first two years after the county was formed, Mosby Tavern served as the Powhatan County courthouse. When a new courthouse was built in 1778, the immediate area was named "Scottville" after General Charles Scott, a Revolutionary War soldier. He was later elected governor of the Commonwealth of Kentucky after it was formed in 1792 as a separate state from land ceded by Virginia. The courthouse area was later named Powhatan.

During the late 18th and early 19th centuries, the county became more developed with expansive plantations as the frontier moved west. Yeomen farmers moved further into the backcountry where land was more affordable. The larger planters used numerous African-American slaves to cultivate and process tobacco, and later mixed crops, including wheat. Even after Reconstruction, Powhatan County used Convict lease to build roads in 1878.
The county continued to be organized on an agricultural economy until after World War II. It still has rural areas and historic plantations, but is being developed with suburban residential housing and related retail.

Geography
It is bordered on the north by the James River and on the south by the Appomattox River.

Adjacent counties
 Goochland County - north
 Chesterfield County - east
 Amelia County - south
 Cumberland County - west
 Henrico County - east (easternmost tip of Powhatan touches the southwestern point of Henrico)

Major highways
 
 
 
 
 SR 711
 SR 609

Demographics

2020 census

Note: the US Census treats Hispanic/Latino as an ethnic category. This table excludes Latinos from the racial categories and assigns them to a separate category. Hispanics/Latinos can be of any race.

2000 Census
As of the census of 2000, there were 22,377 people, 7,258 households, and 5,900 families residing in the county. The population density was 86 people per square mile (33/km2). There were 7,509 housing units at an average density of 29 per square mile (11/km2). The racial makeup of the county was 81.50% White, 16.91% Black or African American, 0.21% Native American, 0.21% Asian, 0.33% from other races, and 0.84% from two or more races. 0.82% of the population were Hispanic or Latino of any race.

The largest ancestry groups in Powhatan County are: English American (18%), African American (17%), German (12%), Irish (11%) and Italian (3%)

There were 7,258 households, out of which 37.50% had children under the age of 18 living with them, 69.70% were married couples living together, 8.10% had a female householder with no husband present, and 18.70% were non-families. 14.60% of all households were made up of individuals, and 4.80% had someone living alone who was 65 years of age or older. The average household size was 2.74 and the average family size was 3.03.

In the county, the population was spread out, with 24.00% under the age of 18, 7.30% from 18 to 24, 34.70% from 25 to 44, 25.60% from 45 to 64, and 8.40% who were 65 years of age or older. The median age was 37 years. For every 100 females, there were 122.30 males. For every 100 females age 18 and over, there were 126.70 males.

The median income for a household in the county was $53,992, and the median income for a family was $58,142. Males had a median income of $37,948 versus $28,204 for females. The per capita income for the county was $24,104. 5.70% of the population and 4.80% of families were below the poverty line. Out of the total people living in poverty, 7.90% are under the age of 18 and 8.60% are 65 or older.

Government
Supervisors of Powhatan County are:
 David T. Williams (District 1)
 Steve W. McClung (Vice Chairman / District 2)
 Michael W. Byerly (Chairman / District 3)
 Bill L. Cox (District 4)
 Karin Moslow Carmack (District 5)

The County Administrator is Bret Schardein.

Education
Powhatan County Public Schools serves over 4,300 students in the county. It is composed of three Elementary schools: Pocahontas Elementary School, Powhatan Elementary School, and Flat Rock Elementary School. These elementary schools currently educate Kindergarten through 5th grade. Powhatan Middle School was completed in 2018, and educates 6th grade through 8th grade. Powhatan High School, located at 1800 Judes Ferry Road, is the county's only secondary school that teaches 9th through 12th grade. The current superintendent of PCPS is Dr. Beth Teigen (2022).

Notable people
 William Henry Ashley, American frontiersman, politician, and co-owner of the Rocky Mountain Fur Company
 John Singleton Mosby, born in Powhatan County, was known by his nickname, the "Gray Ghost", was a Confederate army cavalry commander of the 43rd Battalion in the American Civil War. He later served as the American consul to Hong Kong and also in the U.S. Department of Justice. He  also served as a lawyer for the Southern Pacific Railroad.
 Lynne Doughtie, resident of Powhatan and US Chairwoman and CEO of the major accounting firm KPMG, was named to the "Most Powerful Woman" list of Fortune Magazine.

See also
 National Register of Historic Places listings in Powhatan County, Virginia

References

Further reading

External links
 The County of Powhatan Official Website
 Powhatan's Community Website
 Powhatan County Schools
 Powhatan Today

 
Virginia counties
1777 establishments in Virginia
Populated places established in 1777
Greater Richmond Region